The 8th congressional district of Illinois is a congressional district in the U.S. state of Illinois that has been represented by Democrat Raja Krishnamoorthi since 2017.

Geographic boundaries

2011 redistricting
The congressional district covers parts of Cook County, DuPage County and Kane County, as of the 2011 redistricting which followed the 2010 United States Census. All or parts of Addison, Arlington Heights, Barrington Hills, Bloomingdale, Carol Stream, Carpentersville, East Dundee, Elgin, Elk Grove Village, Glendale Heights, Hanover Park, Hoffman Estates, Lombard, Palatine, Rolling Meadows, Roselle, Schaumburg, South Elgin, Streamwood, Villa Park and Wood Dale are included. These boundaries became effective on January 3, 2013.

2023 redistricting

As of the 2020 redistricting, this district will still be based partially in northern Cook County, and now parts of northern DuPage County and northeast Kane County, as well as part of the Chicago neighborhood of O'Hare.

The 8th district takes in the Cook County municipalities of Schaumburg, Rosemont, Rolling Meadows, South Barrington, and Streamwood; most of Hoffman Estates; half of Des Plaines and Streamwood; the majority of Elk Grove Village west of Tome Rd; part of Palatine; and part of Mt Prospect between Dempster St and W Lonnquist Blvd.

DuPage County is split between this district and the 3rd district. They are partitioned by Bartlett Rd, Old Wayne Golf Course, St Charles Rd, Fair Oaks Rd, Timber Ln, Woodcreek Ln N, Wayne Oaks Dam Reservoir, Morton Rd, Pawnee Dr, County Farm Rd, Highway 64, Gary Ave Della Ave, West St, Geneva Rd, Bloomingdale’s Rd, Glendale Lakes Golf Club, President St, Gilberto St, Schubert Ave, Opal Ave, Stevenson Dr, Highway 4, Polo Club Dr, Canadian National Railway, East Branch Park, Army Trail Rd, Belmont Pl, Addison Trail High School, Woodland Ave, 7th Ave, Lake St, 3rd Ave, Eggerding Dr, Mill Rd, Highway 290, Addison Rd, Oak Meadows Golf & Banquets, Central Ave, Canadian Pacific Railway, Wood Dale Rd, Elmhurt St, and Lively Blvd. The 8th district takes in the municipalities of Bloomingdale and Carol Stream; and part of northern Glendale Heights.

Kane County is split between this district and the 11th district. They are partitioned by Illinois Highway 47, Regency Parkway, Farm Hill Dr, Del Webb Blvd, Jane Adams Memorial Tollway, Sandwald Rd, Ridgecrest Dr, Brier Hill Rd/Illinois Highway 47, Coombs Rd, Shadow Hill Dr, Campton Hills Dr, West Main St, South Tyler Rd, Division St, Fox River, North Washington Ave, Douglas Rd, Orion Rd, and East Fabyan Parkway. The 8th district takes in the municipalities of East Dundee, West Dundee, Elgin, Carpentersville, and Sleepy Hollow; most of Elgin; half of St. Charles; southern Algonquin; a portion of Geneva east of the Fox River; and part of Gilberts.

Recent statewide election results

List of members representing the district

Elections

2012 election

Incumbent Representative Joe Walsh was drawn out of the district for 2012 by 2011 redistricting, although a candidate is not required to live in the district to be eligible to run for a seat in Congress.
Democrat Raja Krishnamoorthi of Hoffman Estates announced his candidacy for the seat in late May 2011. In July 2011, Democrat Tammy Duckworth also announced plans to run for the seat. Duckworth won the Democratic nomination on March 20, 2012.  Duckworth defeated Walsh in the general election on November 6, 2012.

2014

2016

2018

2020

2022

Historical district boundaries

See also
Illinois's congressional districts
List of United States congressional districts

References

Sources

 Congressional Biographical Directory of the United States 1774–present

External links 
Washington Post page on the 8th District of Illinois
U.S. Census Bureau - 8th District Fact Sheet
OpenSecrets.org political contributions and spending
CBS county-by-county return of 2006 votes

08
Congress-08
Constituencies established in 1853
1853 establishments in Illinois